Leonard Thorpe (7 June 1924 – 2012) was an English professional footballer who played in the Football League for Mansfield Town.

References

1924 births
2012 deaths
English footballers
Association football wing halves
English Football League players
Mansfield Town F.C. players
Nottingham Forest F.C. players
Grantham Town F.C. players